Daniel Costa (born 1 September 2000) is a Portuguese footballer who plays for Académica de Coimbra, as a forward.

Football career
On 27 July 2019, Dani made his professional debut with Académica de Coimbra in a 2019–20 Taça da Liga match against Farense.

References

2000 births
Living people
Portuguese footballers
Association football forwards
Associação Académica de Coimbra – O.A.F. players
Liga Portugal 2 players